Čelopek is a village within the municipality of Zvornik, on the Drina river in northeastern Bosnia and Herzegovina.

References

Populated places in Zvornik